E = mc2 is the equation of mass–energy equivalence.

E=MC2 or E=MC2 may also refer to:

Music
 E=MC² (Count Basie album), 1958
 E=MC² (Giorgio Moroder album), 1979
 E=MC² (Mariah Carey album), 2008
 "E=MC2" (song), a 1986 song by Big Audio Dynamite
 "E=MC2", a song by Ayreon from the 2008 album 01011001

Other uses
 "E=MC2" (poem), a 1961 poem by Rosser Reeves
 E=mc2: A Biography of the World's Most Famous Equation, a 2001 book by David Bodanis
 "E=MC2", a 1946 poem by Morris Bishop

See also
 EMC2 (disambiguation)
 MC2 (disambiguation)
 E (disambiguation)